Dusty Fact is the first album by the Russian rock group Splean. It was recorded onto audio cassette at night, in the secrecy of the studio in the St. Petersburg Buff Theatre. At the time Alexander Vasilyev and Alexander Morozov were working there.

Track listing

Personnel
Alexander Vasilyev - Vocals, Guitar
Alexander Morozov - Drum-Machine, Bass Guitar
Nikolay Rostovsky - Keyboards, Wind Instruments

1994 albums
Splean albums